Günter Ambraß (born 16 September 1955) is a retired East German weightlifter who competed in the lightweight category. He won one silver and two bronze medals at three world and European championships in 1978, 1979 and 1980. He finished in fourth and fifth place at the 1976 and 1980 Summer Olympics.

References

1955 births
Living people
Sportspeople from Chemnitz
People from Bezirk Karl-Marx-Stadt
German male weightlifters
Olympic weightlifters of East Germany
Weightlifters at the 1976 Summer Olympics
Weightlifters at the 1980 Summer Olympics